Richárd Bodor (born 10 March 1979 in Pécs, Baranya) is a breaststroke swimmer from Hungary, who won three bronze medals at the 2004 European Championships in Madrid, Spain. He represented his native country at the 2004 Summer Olympics in Athens, Greece, where he was eliminated in the semi-finals of the men's 100 m breaststroke.

References
 
 

1979 births
Living people
Hungarian male swimmers
Male breaststroke swimmers
Olympic swimmers of Hungary
Swimmers at the 2004 Summer Olympics
Swimmers at the 2008 Summer Olympics
European Aquatics Championships medalists in swimming
Universiade medalists in swimming
Universiade bronze medalists for Hungary
Medalists at the 2001 Summer Universiade
Sportspeople from Pécs